Pterymarchia barclayana is a species of large predatory sea snail, a marine gastropod mollusk in the family Muricidae, the rock snails or murex snails.

References

 WoRMS info

Muricidae
Gastropods described in 1873